Auhausen is a municipality in the Swabian district Donau-Ries in Bavaria in Germany. The municipality is within the Oettingen central administrative body. Auhausen was the site of the 1608 meeting that formed the Protestant Union, also known as the Union of Auhausen. Schloss Hirschbrunn, a castle owned by the House of Oettingen-Spielberg, is in Auhausen.

References

Donau-Ries